The Leichhardt River is a river in north west Queensland, Australia.

Course
It runs in a generally northerly direction almost parallel with the Diamantina Developmental Road until it reaches Mount Isa and crosses the Barkly Highway. It continues in a north easterly direction across the Gulf Country passing through Lake Moondarra past Glenroy Station then through Lake Julius. It then bears east then north again almost parallel with the Burke Developmental Road until crossing it near Nardoo. Continuing north past Augustus Downs Station to its mouth at the Gulf of Carpentaria. The river is named after the early explorer of Australia, Ludwig Leichhardt.

Catchment
Primary activities undertaken in the watershed include mining and grazing.

The river is ephemeral and in the dry season the upstream reaches retract to a series of waterholes. The drainage basin and river estuary are in a near pristine condition.

The river is dammed near Mount Isa to form Lake Moondarra. Other storage facilities in the catchment include Julius Dam, East Leichhardt Dam and Rifle Creek Dam. As well as Mount Isa, the small community of Kajabbi is located on the river.

History
In 2009 Xstrata spent $3 million for remediation work involving the removal of 40,000 tonnes of material from the riverbed.

Fossil remains have been found along the river's course. In 2011 an unidentified ancient marsupial was discovered by paleontologists.

See also

References

External links

Rivers of Queensland
North West Queensland
Gulf of Carpentaria